Billerud AB is a Swedish pulp and paper manufacturer with headquarters in Solna, Sweden. The company simplified its name from BillerudKorsnäs to Billerud after the acquisition of Verso 2022, an American producer of coated paper. Billerud has nine production facilities in Sweden, Finland and the USA with around 5,800 employees in over 13 countries.

Its production units are located in Grums, Skärblacka, Frövi/Rockhammar, Gävle and Karlsborg in Sweden, Jakobstad in Finland, Escanaba, Quinnesec and Wisconsin Rapids in the US.

History 
The company was formed in November 2012 through the merger of Billerud AB and Korsnäs AB.

In the 2012 merger, Billerud was the formal buyer. Korsnäs' owner, Investment Kinnevik AB, received a sum of SEK 3.2 billion as well as 25.1% of the votes in the new company and consequently became the largest owner in the merged BillerudKorsnäs. Behind the merger, was an ambition to become an internationally leading packaging manufacturer. 

During the same year, BillerudKorsnäs acquired paper production facilities both in Jakobstad and Tervasaari, Valkeakoski, in Finland from UPM Kymmene. Valkeakoski was closed down and the paper machine for MG paper was moved to Skärblacka mill in 2017.

In 2013, Kinnevik sold its shares in BillerudKorsnäs to pension firms AMF, Alecta and the Fourth Swedish National Pension Fund.

In March 2022, BillerudKorsnäs completed its acquisition of the US-based coated paper company, Verso Corporation for $825m in cash. As a result of the acquisition, according to a press release in October 2022, the company changed its name from BillerudKorsnäs to Billerud "to cater to its international customers".

Production units

In Sweden 

 Gruvön Mill – produces cup stock, fluting, formable paper, kraft paper, liners, sack paper and liquid packaging board
 Skärblacka Mill – produces white machine glazed kraft paper, brown sack paper and fluting
 Karlsborg Mill – produces kraft paper, sack paper, formable paper (FibreForm®) and pulp
 Frövi Mill – produces cartonboard and liquid packaging board
 Gävle Mill – produces liquid carton and liners.

In the US 

 Escanaba Mill – produces graphic papers used in commercial printing, media and marketing
 Quinnesec Mill – produces graphic papers used in commercial printing, media and marketing
 Wisconsin Rapids Converting Facility – converts rolls of paper into folio and digital sheet.

In Finland 

 Jakobstad Mill – produces kraft- and sack paper for food packaging and carrier bags.

Product areas

In 2021, Board corresponds to 57% of the group's net sales and paper corresponds to 31%.

Corporate leadership

Chairmen of the Board 

 Hannu Ryöppönen, 2012–2014
 Lennart Holm, 2014–2019
 Jan Åström 2019-2021
 Jan Svensson 2021-

Chief Executive Officer 

 Per Lindberg, 2012–2017
 Petra Einarsson, 2018–2019
 Lennart Holm, 2019-2020 (acting CEO)
 Christoph Michalski, 2020-

Ownership Structure 
The largest shareholders are AMF Pension & Funds with 14.2 percent of the votes and Frapag Beteiligungholding AG with 12.1 percent (as of April 30, 2022).

See also 

 Holmen
 Stora Enso
 Svenska Cellulosa Aktiebolaget
 UPM (company)

References

External links 
 

Solna Municipality
Companies based in Solna Municipality
Pulp and paper companies of Sweden
Manufacturing companies established in 2012
Swedish companies established in 2012
Companies listed on Nasdaq Stockholm